Donald W. Graham (1883–1976) was a Canadian-American fine artist and art instructor. An early graduate and later a professor at the Chouinard Art Institute (later merged into the California Institute of the Arts), Graham is best known as the head of the internal training and orientation classes at the Walt Disney Productions animation studio from 1932 to 1940.

Assisted by Disney's top animators, Graham helped to document and establish many of the principles that make up the foundation of the art of traditional animation. he posthumously received the Winsor McCay Award for lifetime achievement in the animation field from ASIFA-Hollywood in 1982.

Notes

External links
http://www.donaldwgraham.com/
Letter of Note reprint of interoffice memo from Walt Disney to Don Graham detailing the expansion of Disney's training course in 1935 

1883 births
1976 deaths
Canadian animators
Canadian art educators
Artists from Ontario
Animation educators
Walt Disney Animation Studios people
Canadian emigrants to the United States
People from Thunder Bay